Painsthorpe is a hamlet in the East Riding of Yorkshire, England.

It forms part of the civil parish of Kirby Underdale and was the site of Painsthorpe Abbey, an Anglican Benedictine monastery.

References

External links 

Hamlets in the East Riding of Yorkshire